Scarborough War Memorial is a war memorial at the north end of Oliver's Mount in the town of Scarborough in North Yorkshire. It is listed Grade II on the National Heritage List for England.
The memorial consists of a stone obelisk atop a square pedestal on a square mound. 11 steps lead up to the obelisk.

It was dedicated on 26 September 1923 in a ceremony attended by Councillor William Boyes and Reverend J. Wynwayd Capron. It was later rededicated on 12 November 1950.

The memorial names 241 individuals who died in World War II and 70 who died in the Korean War. The 53 civilians of Scarborough who were killed in World War I and the 42 civilians who died in World War II are also named.

References

External links

A list of names on the Scarborough War Memorial

British military memorials and cemeteries
Buildings and structures in Scarborough, North Yorkshire
Buildings and structures completed in 1923
World War I memorials in England
World War II memorials in England
Monuments and memorials in North Yorkshire
Grade II listed buildings in North Yorkshire